[untitled] is the fourth EP by American indie rock band mewithoutYou. The record was produced by Will Yip.

On August 13, 2018, mewithoutYou released the first single off of the not-yet-announced [Untitled], "Julia (or, 'Holy to the LORD' on the Bells of Horses)." At the same time of the single's release, the band tweeted a link to a page on their website containing only a countdown timer.  The timer finished at 12:00 am Eastern time (05:00 UTC) on August 17, 2018 and the band announced they would be releasing their seventh studio album, [Untitled], on October 5, 2018.  In addition to the full length album announcement, mewithoutYou digitally released a "partner" EP named [untitled].

Track listing
Music by mewithoutYou, lyrics by Aaron Weiss.

References

2018 EPs
MewithoutYou albums
Albums produced by Will Yip